Vilnius Bus Station is the main bus station in Vilnius, Lithuania. It is located next to Vilnius Railway Station.

Routes 

Local routes connect Vilnius Bus Station to most cities, towns and villages in Lithuania. International routes connect Vilnius bus station with the United Kingdom, Austria, Belarus, Hungary, Norway, Sweden, Ukraine, Ireland, Greece, Switzerland, Denmark, Italy, the Czech Republic, Germany, Finland, Spain, Portugal, Belgium, the Netherlands, Morocco, Poland, Estonia, Latvia and France.

References

Links 
 Bus stations in Lithuania

Bus transport in Vilnius  http://autobusustotis.lt/ official website